2GO Air is a logistics and supply chain cargo airline based in Parañaque, Philippines. It operates bulk cargo and express parcel services throughout the Philippines. Its main base is Ninoy Aquino International Airport, Manila. 2GO is operated by the Aboitiz Air Transport Corporation the transport and logistics company owned by Aboitiz Equity Ventures.

Its parent company 2GO Group is part of the Chinese government-controlled 2GO Group (through the China-ASEAN Investment Cooperation Fund) which includes 2GO Travel and 2GO Express.

2GO does not have any aircraft but uses the hold capacity of Cebu Pacific passenger aircraft.

History

See also
 2GO Group
 2GO

References

Bibliography
 Günter Endres (2010). Flight International World Airlines 2010. Sutton, Surrey, England: Reed Business Information. 

Airlines established in 1988
Airlines of the Philippines
Cargo airlines of the Philippines
Companies based in Parañaque
Philippine companies established in 1988